Alfie Stanley (born 2001) is an English footballer who plays as a striker for Dorchester Town

Club career

Portsmouth
Stanley progressed through Pompey's youth categories after joining the club at the age of 6.

On 16 September 2020, Stanley joined Isthmian League side Bognor Regis Town on loan, he made 6 appearances scoring 2 goals before returning to Pompey.

Stanley made his Portsmouth debut in a 1–0 defeat vs West Ham United U21s on 10 November 2020 in the EFL Trophy. Stanley played the first 66 minutes of the game up front.

Stanley again started against Cheltenham Town, playing 77 minutes in a 3–0 win.

He joined Dorchester Town in September 2021, quickly becoming a hit with the Magpies supporters, by netting a second half hat trick away to Tiverton Town. He completed his treble with a lob from the half way line.

Career statistics

References

External links
Portsmouth FC profile

2001 births
Living people
English footballers
Association football forwards
Portsmouth F.C. players
Bognor Regis Town F.C. players